McKaig is a surname. Notable people with the surname include:

Cecil McKaig (1885–1939), British cyclist
Rae McKaig (1922–1996), British Royal Navy admiral
William McMahon McKaig (1845–1907), American politician

See also
McKaig-Hatch, a defunct American tool manufacturing company